Helen's Bay is a village on the northern coast of County Down, Northern Ireland. It is within the townland of Ballygrot, between Holywood, Crawfordsburn and Bangor. It is served by a railway station and had a population of 1,390 in the 2011 Census. It is part of the Ards and North Down Borough Council area.

History 
The village is named after Helen Blackwood, Baroness Dufferin and Claneboye, who owned Clandeboye Estate and was the mother of Frederick Hamilton-Temple-Blackwood, 1st Marquess of Dufferin and Ava.

Places of interest 
Crawfordsburn Country Park, on the southern shores of Belfast Lough, features  of coastline and a small beach. The Park also includes Grey Point Fort, a coastal battery and gun emplacement dating from 1904 and updated during World War II. It now houses a military museum. Helen's Bay Golf Club is located within the village and has a 9-hole course. Chef Michael Deane previously owned a restaurant in the village.

2011 Census 

Helen's Bay is classified by the Northern Ireland Statistics and Research Agency (NISRA) as being within Belfast Metropolitan Urban Area (BMUA). On Census day (29 April 2001) there were 1,362 people living in Helen's Bay. Of these:
20.1% were aged under 17 years and 27.6% were aged 65 and over
47.9% of the population were male and 52.1% were female
65.8% identified as Protestant, 22.2% as non-religious and 10.9% as Roman Catholic specifically.
1.0% of people aged 16–74 were unemployed.

People 
Swimmer Andrew Bree is from Helen's Bay. Local celebrity chef Michael Deane won his 1st Michelin star at Deane's on the Square restaurant. This was only the second Michelin star to be awarded in Northern Ireland.

Climate

Transport
Helen's Bay railway station opened on 1 May 1865 and was closed for goods traffic on 24 April 1950. Helen's Bay is on the Belfast–Bangor railway line with train services provided by Northern Ireland Railways.

Telephone Exchange
Although small, Helen's Bay still has its own BT Telephone exchange. Local numbers exist in the following formats:

 (028) 9185 2XXX
 (028) 9185 3XXX
 (028) 9185 4XXX

See also 
List of towns and villages in Northern Ireland

References 

Villages in County Down
Seaside resorts in Northern Ireland
Civil parish of Bangor